The Edinburgh Exhibition Cup was an invitational football tournament held at the Exhibition Sports Grounds, Saughton, Edinburgh in August 1908, as part of the Scottish National Exhibition event being held there during that summer.

Results 

Rangers beat Dundee on the toss of a coin.

Details

Semi-finals

Final

Both teams had a penalty kick saved during the match.
Rangers won on the toss of a coin.

Teams

Earlier editions
Football was also played at two earlier exhibitions in Edinburgh (the International Exhibition of Industry, Science and Art in 1886 and the International Exhibition of Science, Art & Industry in 1890), although these took the form of a series of single matches (with a cup and medals awarded for the winners of each) rather than a knockout tournament.

1886
All matches played at the exhibition's sports grounds at The Meadows.

1890
All matches played at the exhibition's sports grounds at Meggetland.

See also
1888 Glasgow Exhibition Cup, similar tournament in 1888
Glasgow International Exhibition Cup, similar tournament in 1901
Empire Exhibition Trophy, similar tournament in 1938 (also featuring English clubs)
Saint Mungo Cup, similar tournament in 1951
Coronation Cup (football), similar tournament in 1953 (also featuring English clubs)

References

Scottish football friendly trophies
Sports competitions in Edinburgh
Defunct football cup competitions in Scotland
1908–09 in Scottish football
Football in Edinburgh